Luv Ka The End is a 2011 Hindi comedy drama film directed by Bumpy, starring Shraddha Kapoor and Taaha Shah in the lead roles. The film was the first production of Y-Films, a subsidiary of Yash Raj Films and released to mostly positive reviews on 6 May 2011. The film is also loosely based on the 2009 American film Wild Cherry and the 2006 American film John Tucker Must Die directed by Betty Thomas and John Green's novel Paper Towns.

Plot

Rhea Dialdas has just done her JC (Junior College) and she already fancies herself marrying her charming, rich boyfriend Luv Nanda. who in turn, fancies winning this contest called BBC (Billionaire Boys Club), which is a rage amongst billionaire boys. It is seen that the boys upload videos of themselves with girls, while making out and stuff, on the website, and the more you do so more you get the points. Luv Nanda was going to become the highest scorer that year. This was shown to Rhea by the brother of a friend of Rhea.

The only way for Luv to win this contest was to get Rhea into bed with him on her 18th birthday eve  and have sex with her as, this would've provided him another 1,000 points, which would've propelled his profile to untouchable heights for that year. She goes along naively until she realizes that it's not love, but points that Luv is trying to score. Now out to get him by the balls, she has a plan up her sleeve with her gal pals. Rhea believes that Luv has power as long as his Car, Cash, Charm, and his friends are intact. Rhea makes a pact with Minty (her sister) and then goes to take everything from Luv Nanda by which he attracts girls (who now wants to have Natasha in place of Rhea). She breaks his car, screws his date with Natasha as she accidentally eats the cupcake which was meant for Luv and she is forced to go to the toilet in a public road, spikes his drink with a kind of drug after which, comes the famous Mutton Song where, Luv dances in a bar, dressed up like a girl. The video of him dancing is sent to Luv's friends who believe he is gay and the girls steal his credit cards to buy hot posters of actors and mankinis so that Luv's father thinks he is gay.

Then, at Golu's party, where Freddie Kapoor came to play, she takes Luv to a room where hidden cameras were put to shoot the whole proceeding. Luv, who's found out about Rhea's plan, ties Rhea's hands. But, she unties herself and sprays pepper-spray on Luv to take revenge on him for leaving her and makes him realize the consequences of cheating a girl, and proceeds to tell him that, though girls don't have balls, they sure do know how to kick them after which, she kicks Luv's balls. Before she comes out of the room, she announces that Billionaire Boys Club is officially shut down. When she comes out of the room, she finds everyone cheering for her. Natasha finds out that Rhea destroyed her car, but she forgives Rhea for doing that. Everyone goes to Freddie Kapoor's concert and watches him sing. They all clap for him. Rhea's parents call them and tell them to come back home just in time. Freddie Kapoor witnesses this and asks them if he can drop them off, in which they say "yes". The film proceeds to have Freddie Kapoor drop Rhea at her home and asking Rhea for a date to which Rhea replies by telling him to call her. In a semi post-credits scene, we see Timmy telling Luv that he (Timmy) is gay and he knows that so is Luv (part of the plan of the girls) and jumps on him after lowering his pants.

Cast
 Shraddha Kapoor as Rhea Dialdas
 Taaha Shah as Luv Nanda
 Pushtiie Shakti as Jugs
 Sreejita De as Sonia Lovani
 Errol Marks as Gollu
 Meherzan Mazda as Timmy 
 Riya Bamniyal as Natasha Oberoi
 Rahul Pardasany as Karthikeyan Ramachandran
 Shenaz Treasurywala as Ms.Naaz
 Archana Puran Singh as Lux Lovani (Sonia's Mother)
 Jannat Zubair Rahmani as Minty Dialdas (Rhea's Sister)
 Ali Zafar as Freddie Kapoor 
 Bumpy as Daman Ramachandran (Kartikeyan Brother)
 Natasha Sharma as BBC Website

Soundtrack

The music is composed by Ram Sampath. Lyrics are penned by Amitabh Bhattacharya. The Music got mixed reviews from the critics. Bollywood Hungama gave the music 2.5 stars, stating that it was an album for people looking from a break from the usual Bollywood flare.

Track listing

Reception

The Music got mixed review from the critics. Bollywood Hungama gave the music 2.5 stars, stating that it was an album for people looking from a break from the usual Bollywood flare. Atta Khan wrote "Ram Sampath's focus on experimentation and FUN works wonders in this simple but charming little soundtrack.

Production

Development
On 1 April 2011 the film was unveiled publicly as the first production venture of Y-Films and the cast of the film met the press along with the actors from Y-Films' other two ventures, Mujhse Fraaandship Karoge and Virus Diwan.

Reception

Critical reception

Luv Ka The End opened to positive reviews across India. Taaha Shah and Shraddha Kapoor managed to get rave reviews from most critics. The rest of the characters also were highly praised for their performance. The newcomers showed tremendous confidence and were bang on in their portrayal of the different characters that they played. Pushtiie Shakti who played Jugs in the film was highly praised. Errol Peter Marks who plays gollu was praised by Taran Adarsh. Meherzan Mazda of Seven fame was also appreciated for his portrayal of a Gym Freak.
Taran Adarsh of Bollywood Hungama gave the film 3.5 out of 5 stars. VJ Archana gave the film 4 on 5 stars calling it a crazy fun ride. RJ Jeeturaj praised the film for its freshness, execution and approach. Yahoo movies gave the film 3 out of 5 stars.
Nikhat Kazmi of Times of India rated it 2 out of 5 and wrote – "The film scores only in some of its performances (Shraddha Kapoor's gang) and might appeal to young collegiates who want to miss a few boring tutorials". Entertainment portal FilmiTadka stated – Luv Ka The End is like what Rock music (not in the good sense) is to a Jazz lover, instead of a solid script, the director has tried to fill in voids with noise. Song 'Mutton' to me will the most vulgar song of this year, we at FilmiTadka give it 1.5 out of 5 stars. Anupama Chopra of NDTV said – "Sensibility of this film is not youthful, it's juvenile. And that's before you get to the part where Luv, under the influence of some pill, dresses in drag and breaks into a song that goes: Mera jism, jism, mera badan, badan, main hun taza mutton mutton, khol dilon ke button button. I’m not sure what demographic that is aimed at but it definitely not for me. I’m going with one and a half star".

References

External links

 

2010s Hindi-language films
Films scored by Ram Sampath
Films set in Mumbai
2011 films
Indian romantic comedy films
Indian remakes of American films
Films distributed by Yash Raj Films
2011 romantic comedy films